Political parties in the Maldives were legalized when the Maldivian parliament voted unanimously for the creation of a multi-party system on 2 June 2005. This came after decades of authoritarian rule. Prior to this ruling, political parties had not been not allowed under the Maldivian legal system.

Current list

Parliamentary

Extra-parliamentary

Dissolved parties

Political Party Bill
On March 12, 2013, President Waheed ratified a new 'Political Party Bill', replacing the guidelines established in 2005, when a multi-party system was created in the country. The bill saw the raising of the minimum number of members required to register a political party from 3000 to 10,000. With the ratification of the bill, all political parties which did not have 10,000 members registered were dissolved. From the 11 dissolved parties, Gaumee Itthihaad and Maldives Development Alliance presented the Elections Commission with the needed documents and retained their legitimacy.

The following is a list of parties dissolved under the new law:

See also
 Politics of the Maldives
 List of political parties by country

References

External links
 Register of political parties at the Republic of Maldives Elections Commission.

 
Parties
political parties